Ophiolepis cincta is a brittle star in the family Ophiolepididae, first described in 1842 by Johannes Peter Müller and Franz Hermann Troschel. Ophiolepis garretti is said to be a synonym, but this is not certain.

Distribution 
In Australia this brittle star is found at depths of 0-30 m off the coasts of the Northern Territory, Queensland, and Western Australia, from Rowley Shoals, WA to Swain Reefs in Queensland. Elsewhere it is found in tropical intertidal and subtidal waters in Indian Ocean and west and central Pacific Ocean.

References

External links
Ophiolepis cincta images and occurrence data from GBIF

Ophiurida